The 2016 United States presidential election in Hawaii was held on Tuesday, November 8, 2016, as part of the 2016 United States presidential election in which all 50 states and the District of Columbia participated. Hawaii voters chose electors to represent them in the Electoral College by a popular vote, pitting the Republican Party's nominee, businessman Donald Trump, and running mate Indiana Governor Mike Pence against Democratic Party nominee, former Secretary of State Hillary Clinton, and her running mate Virginia Senator Tim Kaine. Hawaii has four electoral votes in the Electoral College.

Clinton carried the state with 62.88% of the vote. It was her highest vote percentage of any state, though it also represented a significant decrease from Barack Obama's 70.55% vote share from 2012. Trump received 30.36% of the vote, surpassing Mitt Romney's 2012 performance by 3%. Hawaii was one of two states where Clinton won every county, the other being Massachusetts. Hawaii was Green Party nominee Jill Stein's strongest performance, being the only state where she reached 3%. While Clinton won the sizable Asian population on the islands, exit polls showed Trump fared better with whites, Native Hawaiians, and Pacific Islanders, as well as anywhere with a large military presence.

Despite all of Hawaii's electoral votes being pledged to the Clinton/Kaine ticket, one faithless elector voted for Bernie Sanders for president and Elizabeth Warren for vice-president, making Sanders the first Jewish American to receive an electoral vote for president.

Caucuses

Democratic caucuses

Four candidates appeared on the Democratic presidential primary ballot:
Bernie Sanders
Hillary Clinton
Rocky De La Fuente
Martin O'Malley (withdrawn)

Republican caucus
Twelve candidates appeared on the Republican presidential primary ballot:
Donald Trump
Ted Cruz
John Kasich
Jeb Bush (withdrawn)
Ben Carson (withdrawn)
Chris Christie (withdrawn)
Carly Fiorina (withdrawn)
Lindsey Graham (withdrawn)
Mike Huckabee (withdrawn)
Rand Paul (withdrawn)
Marco Rubio
Rick Santorum (withdrawn)

Delegates were awarded to candidates at the statewide and congressional district level proportionally.

General election

Predictions

Statewide results

Results by county

Results by congressional district
Clinton won both congressional districts.

See also
Democratic Party presidential debates, 2016
Democratic Party presidential primaries, 2016
Republican Party presidential debates, 2016
Republican Party presidential primaries, 2016

Notes

References

HI
2016
United States presidential